Gabriele Steidl (born Drauschke, 1963) is a German mathematician whose research interests include computational harmonic analysis, convex optimization, and image processing. She is a professor of mathematics at the Technical University of Berlin.

Education and career
Steidl studied mathematics at the University of Rostock, earning a doctorate (Dr. rer. nat.) in 1988 and completing her habilitation in 1991. Her doctoral dissertation, Grundlagen schneller Algorithmen für verallgemeinerte diskrete Fouriertransformationen, concerned fast algorithms for the discrete Fourier transform and was supervised by Manfred Tasche.

After consulting for a German insurance association, she became an assistant professor at Technische Universität Darmstadt in 1993. She moved to the University of Mannheim as a professor in 1996, and moved again to the Technical University of Kaiserslautern in 2011 before taking her present position at the Technical University of Berlin in 2020.
From 2020-21, she is program director of the SIAM Activity Group on Imaging Science.

Book
 with

Recognition
Steidl was elected as a Fellow of the Society for Industrial and Applied Mathematics, in the 2022 Class of SIAM Fellows, "for contributions to computational harmonic analysis and imaging sciences".

References

External links
 
 

1963 births
Living people
20th-century German mathematicians
German women mathematicians
University of Rostock alumni
Academic staff of Technische Universität Darmstadt
Academic staff of the University of Mannheim
Academic staff of the Technical University of Kaiserslautern
Academic staff of the Technical University of Berlin
Fellows of the Society for Industrial and Applied Mathematics